H37 may refer to:
 H-37 (Michigan county highway)
 , a Royal Navy G-class destroyer
 London Buses route H37, a Transport for London contracted bus route
 RBM5, a gene
 Sikorsky CH-37 Mojave, an American helicopter